The following is a list of football stadiums in Algeria, ordered by capacity. Currently stadiums with a capacity of 5,000 or more are included, most large stadiums in Algeria are used for football (soccer), with some also used for athletics and rugby union.

Current stadiums

Under construction

Future stadiums
All of these stadiums have been to postpone the start of the works due to the economic crisis.

See also
List of African stadiums by capacity
List of association football stadiums by capacity

References

 
Algeria
Football stadiums in Algeria